Carbrini Sportswear is a leisure wear brand of clothing that is sold at JD Sports and Argos. They have developed a full range of leisure wear, ranging from trainers to tracksuits. They also have a line of school bags and lunchboxes. The brand is associated with football and several pro teams that play in the English and Scottish football pyramids are supplied with Carbrini kits and training range.

Involvement in football
Carbrini was first introduced to JD Sports in 2006 with their funky clothing line of urban footwear.

In March 2009 Carbrini Sportswear manufactured a one-off set of unique pink kits for Oldham Athletic for their home game against Leeds United. After the game the kits were auctioned off on the club's website and all proceeds were donated to a charity associated with the Victoria Breast Unit at the Royal Oldham Hospital.

The Carbrini Sportswear football shirts use Carbrini CBX TEX garment technology, which makes the shirts more breathable and able to wick moisture away from the skin. From the start of the 2010–11 season the shirts featured the innovative "Twist" design. "The Twist" is an intelligent shirt that allows the shirt to work with the movement of the body.

Football clubs supplied
Championship
League One
League Two

Football clubs formerly supplied
 Tranmere Rovers
 Crewe Alexandra
 Luton Town
 Morecambe
 Walsall
 Notts County
 Birmingham City 
 Aldershot Town
 Blackpool
 AFC Bournemouth
 Carlisle United
 Exeter City
 Macclesfield Town
 Oldham Athletic
 Rochdale
 Inverness Caledonian Thistle
 Ross County
 St Mirren

References

External links
Carbrini Replica Shirts
Carbrini Sportswear

Clothing brands
Sportswear brands
Sporting goods manufacturers of the United Kingdom
Sporting goods brands
Clothing companies of the United Kingdom
British brands